Pat Lee is the name of:

Pat Lee (comics) (born 1975), Canadian comic book artist
Pat Lee (politician) (born 1944), former Irish Fine Gael politician from Dublin
Pat Lee (American football) (born 1984), American football cornerback

See also 
Patrick Lee (disambiguation)